Chruściński (feminine: Chruścińska; plural: Chruścińscy) is a Polish surname. Notable people with this surname include:

 Mateusz Chruściński (born 1987), Polish figure skater
 Radosław Chruściński (born 1991), Polish figure skater

See also
 
 

Polish-language surnames